Myelaphus is a genus of robber flies in the family Asilidae. There are about six described species in Myelaphus.

Species
These six species belong to the genus Myelaphus:
 Myelaphus bokhai Lehr, 1999 c g
 Myelaphus dispar (Loew, 1873) c g
 Myelaphus jozanus Matsumura, 1916 c g
 Myelaphus lobicornis (Osten Sacken, 1877) i c g
 Myelaphus melas Bigot, 1882 i c g b
 Myelaphus ussuriensis Lehr, 1999 c g
Data sources: i = ITIS, c = Catalogue of Life, g = GBIF, b = Bugguide.net

References

Further reading

 
 
 

Asilidae genera
Articles created by Qbugbot